Chiloglanis is a genus of upside-down catfishes native to Africa. These species have modified lips and barbels that form a suckermouth. They also have a naked (scaleless) body. Sexual dimorphism has been reported in Chiloglanis. The adult males of many of these species have elongate anal and caudal fins. Also, males may have an enlarged humeral process.

Species
There are currently 51 recognized species in this genus:
 Chiloglanis angolensis Poll, 1967
 Chiloglanis anoterus R. S. Crass, 1960 (Pennant-tailed suckermouth)
 Chiloglanis asymetricaudalis De Vos, 1993
 Chiloglanis batesii Boulenger, 1904
 Chiloglanis benuensis Daget & Stauch, 1963
 Chiloglanis bifurcus R. A. Jubb & Le Roux, 1969 (Incomati suckermouth)
 Chiloglanis brevibarbis Boulenger, 1902 (Short-barbelled suckermouth)
 Chiloglanis cameronensis Boulenger, 1904 
 Chiloglanis carnosus T. R. Roberts & D. J. Stewart, 1976 
 Chiloglanis congicus Boulenger, 1920 
 Chiloglanis deckenii W. K. H. Peters, 1868 (Pangani suckermouth)
 Chiloglanis devosi R. C. Schmidt, H. L. Bart & Nyingi, 2015 
 Chiloglanis disneyi Trewavas, 1974 
 Chiloglanis elisabethianus Boulenger, 1915 
 Chiloglanis emarginatus R. A. Jubb & Le Roux, 1969 (Phongolo suckermouth)
 Chiloglanis fasciatus Pellegrin, 1936 (Okavango suckermouth)
 Chiloglanis harbinger T. R. Roberts, 1989 
 Chiloglanis igamba Friel & Vigliotta, 2011 
 Chiloglanis kalambo Seegers, 1996 (Kalambo suckermouth)
 Chiloglanis kazumbei Friel & Vigliotta, 2011 
 Chiloglanis kerioensis R. C. Schmidt, H. L. Bart & Nyingi, 2015 
 Chiloglanis lamottei Daget, 1948 
 Chiloglanis lufirae Poll, 1976 
 Chiloglanis lukugae Poll, 1944 
 Chiloglanis macropterus Poll & D. J. Stewart, 1975 
 Chiloglanis marlieri Poll, 1952 
 Chiloglanis mbozi Seegers, 1996 (Mbozi suckermouth)
 Chiloglanis micropogon Poll, 1952 
 Chiloglanis microps Matthes, 1965 
 Chiloglanis modjensis Boulenger, 1904 
 Chiloglanis mongoensis R. C. Schmidt & Barrientos, 2019 
 Chiloglanis neumanni Boulenger, 1911 (Neumann's suckermouth)
 Chiloglanis niger T. R. Roberts, 1989 
 Chiloglanis niloticus Boulenger, 1900 
 Chiloglanis normani Pellegrin, 1933 
 Chiloglanis occidentalis Pellegrin, 1933 
 Chiloglanis orthodontus Friel & Vigliotta, 2011 
 Chiloglanis paratus R. S. Crass, 1960 (Saw-fin suckermouth)
 Chiloglanis pojeri Poll, 1944 
 Chiloglanis polyodon Norman, 1932 
 Chiloglanis polypogon T. R. Roberts, 1989 
 Chiloglanis pretoriae van der Horst, 1931 (Short-spine suckermouth)
 Chiloglanis productus H. H. Ng & R. M. Bailey, 2006 
 Chiloglanis reticulatus T. R. Roberts, 1989 
 Chiloglanis rukwaensis Seegers, 1996 (Lake Rukwa suckermouth)
 Chiloglanis ruziziensis De Vos, 1993 
 Chiloglanis sanagaensis T. R. Roberts, 1989 
 Chiloglanis sardinhai Ladiges & Voelker, 1961 
 Chiloglanis somereni Whitehead, 1958 (Someren's suckermouth)
 Chiloglanis swierstrai van der Horst, 1931 (Lowveld suckermouth)
 Chiloglanis trilobatus Seegers, 1996 (Three-lobed suckermouth)
 Chiloglanis voltae Daget & Stauch, 1963

References

 
Mochokidae
Fish of Africa
Catfish genera
Taxa named by Wilhelm Peters
Freshwater fish genera